The Lord of the Rings: The Two Towers: Original Motion Picture Soundtrack was released on 10 December 2002. The score was composed, orchestrated, and conducted by Howard Shore, and performed by the London Philharmonic Orchestra, the London Voices, and the London Oratory School Schola. The Two Towers comes in a regular and a limited edition, the latter containing the additional track "Farewell to Lórien".

Reception 

The Two Towers won the Grammy Award for Best Score Soundtrack Album.

Track listing

Charts and certifications

Charts

Certifications

Complete Recording and additional music 
In 2006, Reprise Records released a multi-disc set for the film, titled The Complete Recordings. These contain the entire score for the extended versions of the film on CD, along with an additional DVD-Audio disc that offers 2.0 stereo and 5.1 surround mixes of the soundtrack. The album also featured extensive liner notes by music journalist Doug Adams which reviews all of the tracks and provides information about the process of composing and recording the score, as well as a detailed list of all musical instruments, people and organizations involved. The cover artwork uses the film series' logo and an inscription in Tolkien's tengwar letters, over a background that depicts Rohan and Fangorn in dark blue.

Additional Music 
Additional music for the film was featured in The Rarities Archive release, attached to Doug Adams' book on the three film scores:Along with about 4 minutes of alternate material from the original release, about 8 minutes of alternates in the fan credits, and some additional alternates, there are about 3:40 minute of finalized music from The Two Towers.

References

2002 soundtrack albums
2000s film soundtrack albums
Classical music soundtracks
The Lord of the Rings (film series) music
Howard Shore soundtracks